Gama is a sub-prefecture of Hadjer-Lamis Region in Chad.

References 

Populated places in Chad